Mespirenone (INN) (developmental code name ZK-94679), also known as Δ1-15β,16β-methylenespironolactone, is a steroidal antimineralocorticoid of the spirolactone group related to spironolactone that was never marketed. Animal research found that it was 3.3-fold more potent as an antimineralocorticoid relative to spironolactone. In addition to its antimineralocorticoid properties, mespirenone is also a progestogen, antigonadotropin, and antiandrogen. It is 2- to 3-fold as potent as spironolactone as a progestogen and antigonadotropin but its antiandrogenic activity is markedly reduced and weak (though still of significance) in comparison. Mespirenone is also a potent and specific enzyme inhibitor of 18-hydroxylase and thus of mineralocorticoid biosynthesis. The drug was under development by Schering (now Bayer Schering Pharma) and reached phase II clinical trials but was discontinued in 1989.

See also
 Canrenone
 Drospirenone
 Spironolactone

References

Aldosterone synthase inhibitors
Antimineralocorticoids
Cyclopropanes
Pregnanes
Spiro compounds
Spirolactones
Steroidal antiandrogens